Lorelei (sometimes spelled Lorelai, Loreley, or Lorilee) is a feminine given name originating from the name of the rock headland on the Rhine River. Legends say that a maiden named Lorelei lived on the rock and lured fishermen to their deaths with her song.

People 
Loreley, pen name of Mexican writer María Luisa Garza (1887–1980)
Luisana Loreley Lopilato de la Torre (born 1987), Argentine actress and model

Fictional characters 
Lorelei Lee, Marilyn Monroe's character in Gentlemen Prefer Blondes
Lorelai Gilmore, a character on the American television series Gilmore Girls
Lorelei (Asgardian), a character in the Marvel Comics Universe and the Marvel Cinematic Universe
Lorelei (Pokémon), an Elite Four member in Pokémon Red and Blue, Pokémon Yellow, Pokémon FireRed and LeafGreen
 Dr. Lorelei Tsing, a doctor from American science fiction television series The 100
 A Star Trek animated episode entitled The Lorelei Signal involved alien women able to mentally enslave the men of the U.S.S. Enterprise.
 Lorelei, one of the Valkyries and priestesses in the book A Court of Silver Flames by Sarah J. Maas.

Feminine given names
English feminine given names